Hélène Kirsova (18 June 1910 – 22 February 1962) was a Danish prima ballerina, choreographer and ballet teacher and is noted as the founder of the first professional ballet company in Australia. She trained in Paris with former Sergei Diaghilev ballet dancers and choreographers. She then performed in companies run by Léo Staats and Ida Rubinstein before in 1931 becoming a soloist with Les Ballets Russes de Monte Carlo, dancing for several years in Europe and North America. In 1936, as a principal dancer, she joined René Blum's Les Ballets de Monte-Carlo in which she scored a singular success in London. Later that year she joined Colonel Wassily de Basil's Monte Carlo Russian Ballet as prima ballerina on an extensive tour of Australia and New Zealand where she was fêted by critics and audiences. She remained in Australia, started a ballet school in Sydney, and in 1941 formed the Kirsova Ballet. Despite wartime restrictions she directed the company for several years before retiring in 1948. She has been described as the "Godmother" of Australian ballet.

Early life
Ellen Elisabeth Kirsten Wittrup Hansèn, later professionally known as Hélène Kirsova, was born in the Danish capital of Copenhagen (København ) on 18 June 1910, the youngest of four children. Her father, Christian Sophüs Ferdinand Hansèn, who was born in Rørvig, Denmark in 1874, was a restaurateur and garage owner. Her mother was Ingeborg Marie Katrine Vittrup or Wittrup born in 1872 in Ålborg, Denmark.

As a small child, Kirsova watched one of her elder sisters dance using Dalcroze eurhythmics, and secretly in her own room at night danced by herself. When she was 8 or 9 she was taken to the Royal Danish Theatre where, to the choreography of Michel Fokine, three Russian ballets were given: Les Sylphides, Petrushka and the ballet from Prince Igor. After that performance she resolved to be a dancer and perform those same ballets.

Adopting her mother's maiden name (Wittrup) as her surname, Kirsova began ballet classes in Copenhagen with Emilie Walbom. Now those who survived were being demobilised and Kirsova was anxious that the men who wanted to return to dancing should be able to do so. One important attender of her classes was Henry Legerton, back from army service and working enthusiastically to make up for lost time.

Kirsova continued to hope that one day she would be able to set up her ballet company again, and in pursuit of establishing a suitable theatre in Sydney not controlled by the J. C. Williamson organisation, in July 1946 she became involved in discussions about the future of Sydney's 2,000-seat Capitol Theatre, which was to be sold by the City Council. Kirsova had long maintained that it should be preserved and set up as a national theatre for drama, ballet and opera. She was opposed by both the city's politicians and executives of the Australian Broadcasting Commission and her attempts failed (though, many decades later, the theatre is now host to major musicals, ballet and opera).

The school continued to operate until it closed in January 1948, though Kirsova herself was not involved in its final stages as at the end of 1946 she returned to Denmark. She took a house just outside Copenhagen and lived there with her son Ole.  On 16 October 1947 she obtained a divorce from Fischer.

On 3 April 1948, at the British Consulate in Paris, she married her long-term supporter and associate, Australian Peter Bellew.  There was only one guest at the wedding ceremony: Wolfgang Cardamatis, one of Kirsova's former set designers. The Bellews honeymooned in Florence, Italy.

Kirsova had known Bellew for some time through their shared passion for modern art and he had edited Pioneering Ballet in Australia, a history of the Kirsova Ballet, published in 1945. Bellew had recently joined the Paris-based United Nations Educational, Scientific and Cultural Organisation (UNESCO) as a visual art expert in charge of the Arts and Letters Division and he and Kirsova and her son Ole set up home in an old house in the village of Saint-Prix outside Paris. They later moved to a sixth-floor Paris apartment in Rue Galilée near the Arc de Triomphe, a short walk from the UNESCO headquarters in Avenue Kléber.

The Bellews returned regularly to Australia, and in a visit in July 1949, speaking to the press, Kirsova stated that she "deplored the tendency, now prevalent in Europe, of gathering a corps de ballet around just one of two principal dancers and so forming numerous small companies, instead of building up strong companies with international reputations, such the famous Diaghilev and de Basil Ballets Russes groups".

In October 1951, Kirsova gave birth to a second son, who she and Bellew named Ib, a Danish diminutive of Jakob. Now known as Hélène Bellew, Kirsova moved into a life of relaxation, "always beautifully dressed in simple grey or black clothes (often from Dior)". She was a keen hostess, entertaining dancers, musicians and artists from Australia, and colleagues from her earlier days. She continued to collect contemporary art and became a keen photographer.

In January 1952 at a stopover at Sydney Airport on her way to visit Peter Bellew's parents in Melbourne, she told reporters of her intention to reopen the Kirsova Ballet. But seeing the Borovansky Ballet was in the midst of a record-breaking tour of Australasia and theatre ownership was still being monopolised by J. C. Williamson, she abandoned her ideas for a comeback.

In 1956 after visiting Moscow and Leningrad (Saint Petersburg), she published Ballet in Moscow Today, a record of the complete repertoire of the Bolshoi Ballet. Since the Russian Revolution of 1917 the West knew little of what had been happening in Russian ballet. She analysed and appraised the Russian dancers' technique, after attending rehearsals and performances and talking with all the leading dancers, choreographers and administrators. "One of the greatest experiences of my life," she said of her visit. She also contributed to A Dictionary of Modern Ballet in 1959.

Kirsova died early and suddenly. On a regular trip to London in 1962 with her husband, she was taken seriously ill. An emergency operation was performed at Guy's Hospital, but she died there of cancer on 22 February 1962, at the age of 51. She was cremated.

Legacy
Hélène Kirsova's outstanding legacy was her short-lived but highly regarded Kirsova Ballet, the first professional indigenous ballet company in Australia, which amid the deprivations of the Second World War was one of the foundation stones of Australian Ballet.

She was one of the crucial links between the Diaghilev dancers of the early twentieth century and those who dance today. Michelle Potter has written that the fact that hers was the first professional company in Australia "should be enough to ensure Kirsova a permanent place in dance history". Kirsova discovered and encouraged into successful and long-standing careers in international ballet a number of Australasian dancers. Among them were Rachel Cameron, Strelsa Heckelman, Paul Hammond, Peggy Sager, and Henry Legerton.

Potter has also observed that Kirsova made another "enduring and significant contribution to ballet in Australia: being a pioneering patron of theatre design by Australian artists."

Michael Salter in his biography of Edouard Borovansky concluded: "If Boro (Borovansky) is to be assessed as the father of Australian ballet, Kirsova is, at least, its godmother, and she bestowed a splendid gift at its christening."

The success of Kirsova's company was due in large part to her famously well-regarded tour of Australia with the Ballets Russes in the late 1930s. Arnold Haskell stated that "It was Miss Kirsova's personal success in Australia which planted the first real seed of ballet in that country and made the rest much easier for those who followed her."

Kirsova left eight new ballets which she choreographed for the Kirsova Ballet company. In July 1941 A Dream – and a Fairy Tale and Vieux Paris were both premiered at the New South Wales Conservatorium in Sydney. November 1941 saw the premiere of Faust at the Minerva Theatre, Sydney. Five new ballets appeared in 1943, all premiered at the Conservatorium: Revolution of the Umbrellas in February, Hansel and Gretel in March, Jeunesse and Capriccio in July, and Harlequin in December.

In 1944 and 1945 two books were published in celebration of the Kirsova Ballet. The first, in 1944, was Kirsova Australian Ballet, a collection of drawings and sketches by Trevor Clara made backstage and in the wings during rehearsals and performances. It included a lengthy introduction by Kirsova in which she repeated her belief that ballet is a combination of many arts rather than just dancing, and that such artistic availability existed to be encouraged in Australia. She insisted that trying to keep ballet alive in war-time was "heart-breaking" but that she had done her best to do so, feeling that cultural entertainment during war "is more than ever necessary". She also made another plea for financial support for Australian Ballet. Copies of the book are hard to come by at a reasonable price, though the State Library of Victoria has made it freely available to read digitally.

In 1945, Peter Bellew published Pioneering Ballet in Australia, a well-illustrated history of the Kirsova Ballet with stories of the ballets in the company's repertoire, and many of the facts around their production. Due to the war, paper for book production was rationed, but Kirsova's wealthy patron, the newspaper owner Warwick Fairfax, used his influence with the government to allow the book to be published. It was republished in 1946 with an Introduction by the English critic Neville Cardus. Second-hand copies are readily available.

Kirsova's other singular legacy were the charitable donations from profits made by her ballet company, which were instrumental in purchasing blocks of land to establish a still-existing chain of children's playgrounds in Sydney's then poor and overcrowded inner suburbs, namely Kirsova Park 1 at 67 MacDonald St, Erskineville NSW 2043; Kirsova Park 2 at 136–140 George St, Erskineville NSW 2043; and Kirsova Park 3 at Wigram Lane, Glebe NSW 2037.

Archives and research material
The Papers of Hélène Kirsova between 1932 and 1945, donated by Peter Bellew in 1986, are held by the National Gallery of Australia in Canberra, Australian Capital Territory. They comprise a large collection of press clippings, programmes, photographs of ballet performances and ballet dancers, lighting plots and original scores for a number of Kirsova's own choreographies and over 100 original set and costume designs commissioned by Kirsova during the 1940s. Further details are available in a National Gallery of Australia Research Library finding aid, which also links to Kirsova and Kirsova Ballet material in other collections.

A vast amount of material relating to Kirsova and the Kirsova Ballet is listed freely in Trove, the National Library of Australia's exhaustive collection of links to collections in Australian libraries, universities, museums, galleries and archives, consisting of newspapers, magazines, images, research, books, diaries, letters, people, organisations and websites.
    
Film exists of some of Kirsova's performances when in Australia with de Basil's Ballets Russes in 1936 and 1937. There is also film of Kirsova's wedding to Erick Fischer in 1938. This surviving footage can be freely viewed on the website of the National Film and Sound Archive of Australia.

Some of the productions of the Ballets Russes in Australia and of the Kirsova Ballet were filmed by a Melbourne balletomane and ciné enthusiast, Dr J Ringland Anderson. The films were first made public in a one-hour documentary, called Another Beginning, produced for Australian television in 1975. They have been transferred to nine hours of videotape and are available to researchers and dance historians in the Australian Archives of the Dance, held in the Performing Arts Collection of the Arts Centre Melbourne, Victoria where further photographs of Kirsova and the Kirsova Ballet are also held.

As well as those held by the National Gallery of Australia and the Melbourne Arts Centre, a significant number of photographs of Kirsova both off-stage and performing can be viewed in the website catalogue of the National Library of Australia.

Oral histories have been recorded by a number of dancers of the Kirsova Ballet, including Paul Hammond, Peggy Sager and Tamara Tchinarova. These can be listened to on the website of the National Library of Australia.

Further reading
Hélène Bellew (Hélène Kirsova), Ballet in Moscow Today, Thames and Hudson, London, England, 1956.

Peter Bellew, Pioneering Ballet in Australia, Craftsman Bookshop, Sydney, New South Wales, Australia, 1945.

Mark Carroll (Editor), The Ballets Russes in Australia and Beyond, Wakefield Press, Kent Town, South Australia, 2011.

Judith Chazin-Bennahum, René Blum and the Ballets Russes: In Search of a Lost Life, Oxford University Press, Oxford, England, 2011.

Vicente García-Marquez, The Ballets Russes: Colonel de Basil's Ballets Russes de Monte Carlo 1932–1952, Alfred A Knopf, New York, NY, USA, 1990.

Arnold L Haskell, Balletomania: The Story of an Obsession, Victor Gollancz, London, England, 1934.

Arnold L Haskell, Dancing Round the World: Memoirs of an Attempted Escape from Ballet, Victor Gollancz, London, England, 1937.

John Hood, Peggy Sager: Prima Ballerina, John Hood, North Ryde, New South Wales, Australia, 2004.

Michael Meylac (Editor), Behind the Scenes at the Ballets Russes: Stories from a Silver Age, I.B. Tauris, London, England, 2018.

Valerie Lawson, Dancing Under the Southern Skies: A History of Ballet in Australia, Australian Scholarly Publishing, North Melbourne, Victoria, Australia, 2019.

Frank Salter, Borovansky: The Man Who Made Australian Ballet, Wildcat Press, Sydney, New South Wales, Australia, 1980.

Kathrine Sorley Walker, De Basil's Ballets Russes, Hutchinson, London, England, 1982.

References

Danish ballerinas
Danish expatriates in Australia
Danish expatriates in England
Ballet teachers
1910 births
1962 deaths
Ballet Russe de Monte Carlo dancers
Australian ballerinas
20th-century ballet dancers
20th-century Australian women